Glenea chlorospila is a species of beetle in the family Cerambycidae. It was described by Charles Joseph Gahan in 1897. It is known from Taiwan and Japan.

Subspecies
 Glenea chlorospila chlorospila Gahan, 1897
 Glenea chlorospila hachijonis Matsumura & Matsushita, 1933
 Glenea chlorospila hayashii Nakane, 1963
 Glenea chlorospila okinawensis Makihara, 1988

References

chlorospila
Beetles described in 1897